Retreat is a 2011 British horror-thriller film  and the directorial debut of former film editor Carl Tibbets. The film stars Cillian Murphy, Jamie Bell, and Thandiwe Newton as three people isolated from the rest of the world on a remote island. Two of them are told they are survivors of a fatal airborne disease that is sweeping over the entire world. However, their induced isolation may be the result of a lie, and it may be that they are being held at the whim of a madman.

Plot 
London architect Martin Kennedy (Cillian Murphy) and his unhappy journalist wife Kate (Thandiwe Newton) often visit a small, remote, uninhabited island off the west coast of Scotland called Blackholme Island for their holiday retreats. The only dwelling on the island, Fairweather Cottage, is seasonally operated by the owner Doug from the mainland and only reachable by ferry. After previously suffering a miscarriage, Kate's relationship with Martin has become tense, and in an effort to rekindle their marriage they decide on a return visit to the island. A few nights into their stay, the generator in the cottage explodes, injuring Martin's arm and leaving them without electricity. They use the CB radio, their only source of communication to the mainland, to call Doug, who ferries out to help them.

Kate spends the next day waiting at the jetty for Doug to arrive, but to no avail. Later a mysterious man in green combat fatigues washes up on the island, bloodied and half-conscious. When he comes round, he identifies himself as a soldier, Private Jack Coleman (Jamie Bell). He tells Martin and Kate that there has been an outbreak of an airborne disease, Argromoto Flu, codenamed R1N16, which started in South America and has spread over the entire world in the time-span of a few weeks. The disease is incurable and highly contagious, attacking the respiratory system and causing the victims to choke on blood with a 100% fatality rate. Jack says that the military have lost control, and are now advising civilians to seal themselves up in their homes and not allow anybody access. With only static now coming from the CB radio, Martin decides to play it safe and help Jack, who aggressively takes command and boards up the door and windows.

Over the next few days, Jack becomes increasingly strange and erratic, and his intimidating behaviour begins to disturb the couple even further. They suspect that the virus may be a lie and that Jack is insane. When Kate asks him if he is married, he tells her his wife died of R1N16 and he becomes aggressive and threatening. Martin and Kate decide to leave the cottage and take their chances outside, but Jack refuses to let them, forcing them into the bedroom at gunpoint and locking them in. Martin sneaks outside through a skylight, finding the bodies of Doug and his wife at the pier, killed by gunshot. Using Doug's hunting shotgun, Martin returns to the cottage and gets the upper hand on Jack. However, just as Kate begins to tie Jack's hands behind his back, Martin suddenly begins coughing up blood; it appears the Argromoto Flu is very real and he is infected. Kate is forced to shoot her husband dead with the shotgun, to spare him a slow and agonising death.

Forced at gunpoint, Jack reveals to Kate that he was experimented on at a military compound and released without anyone having realized he was a carrier of R1N16. Jack had infected his wife, killing her, and fled to Blackholme Island to quarantine himself where the couple found him. Jack reveals that the CB radio worked all along, and he had just changed the settings so that Kate and Martin would not be able to reach anyone. Jack fixes the CB radio, and the military broadcast on it claims that the soldiers have a vaccine against the virus. Jack tells Kate that the military are lying; there is no vaccine, and the military would kill them both if they were discovered. Kate does not believe him and, angered by the possibility that Martin could have been saved, she shoots Jack dead. As she attempts to leave the island in the boat with Martin's body, a military helicopter flies over and she is killed by a sniper who shoots her in the head.

Cast 
 Cillian Murphy as Martin Kennedy
 Thandiwe Newton as Kate Kennedy (credited as Thandie Newton)
 Jamie Bell as Pvt. Jack Coleman
 Jimmy Yuill as Doug, the boat ferryman and owner of Fairweather Cottage

Release 
Retreat premiered at the Fantasia Film Festival on July 18, 2011 and received a limited release in the United Kingdom and the United States respectively on October 12 and 14 2011.

Reception 

Bloody Disgusting rated it 4.5/5 stars and praised the intense, chilling atmosphere and plot twists. Peter Bradshaw of The Guardian rated it 3/5 stars and called it "a neat, tense thriller from a first time director that provides a decent role for Jamie Bell". John Anderson of Variety wrote, "A potential menage a trois of terror is served up as rather weak tea in Retreat, which fails to make its alleged suspense, thrills or even its mist-enshrouded landscapes particularly plausible." Neil Smith of Total Film rated it 3/5 stars and called it "tense if rather monotonously bleak". Mark Adams of Screen Daily wrote, "An unrelentingly moody and claustrophobic three-handed thriller, Retreat is an assured and nicely staged debut from Carl Tibbetts that might feel all rather familiar but manages to keep the story suitably unpredictable and nicely paced." Damon Wise of Empire wrote that the performances make up for the story. David Nussair of Reel Film Reviews wrote that "Retreat inevitably (and lamentably) establishes itself as a generic and hopelessly uninvolving thriller that grows more and more tedious as it progresses." Scott Weinberg of Fearnet concluded that the film is "certainly more engaging than its basic premise might imply".

See also 

 Dead Calm
 It Comes at Night

References

External links
 
 
 
 

2011 films
2011 horror films
2011 thriller drama films
British horror films
British thriller drama films
Films about couples
Films about infectious diseases
Films about murder
Films set in Scotland
Films set on uninhabited islands
Citizens band radio in popular culture
2011 directorial debut films
2011 drama films
Films about viral outbreaks
Films scored by Ilan Eshkeri
2010s English-language films
2010s British films
Vertigo Films films